Harry Potter and the Deathly Hallows (soundtrack) may refer to:

 Harry Potter and the Deathly Hallows – Part 1 (soundtrack)
 Harry Potter and the Deathly Hallows – Part 2 (soundtrack)